Crosbies is a village in Saint John Parish, Antigua and Barbuda.

Demographics 
Crosbies has three enumeration districts.

 30700 Crosbies-Sandpiper 
 30800 Crosbies-Mill Tower 
 30900 Crosbies-W.I.O.C.

Census Data (2011) 
Source:

Individual

Household 
There are 382 households in Crosbies.

References 

Populated places in Antigua and Barbuda
Saint John Parish, Antigua and Barbuda